Tom Caltabiano is a writer and stand-up comedian.  He directed and co-starred in the documentary 95 Miles to Go with longtime friend Ray Romano. He was a writer/producer on Everybody Loves Raymond and took over 30,000 behind-the-scenes photos of the show.  Caltabiano was a guest host for CBS's The Late, Late Show in 2004 when Craig Kilborn abruptly exited.  He was the inspiration for Terry Elliott, the character Scott Bakula played on TNT's Men of a Certain Age.

References

External links
 
 Official 95 Miles to Go Website
 Official Everybody Loves Raymond Behind-the-Scenes Photo Gallery
 The Kimchi Chronicles on Amazon
 Everybody Loves Raymond: Our Family Album on Amazon
 Tom Caltabiano photos in Russia's Autopilot Magazine

American television writers
American male television writers
American stand-up comedians
Living people
Place of birth missing (living people)
Year of birth missing (living people)